Jiří Bílek (born 4 November 1983) is a Czech former professional footballer who played as a centre-back.

Playing career
Born in Prague, Bílek began his career at FK Neratovice–Byškovice before being scouted from FK Chmel Blšany in 2003. He played in Blšany three years before being transferred to FC Slovan Liberec in 2006. On 7 January 2009, he signed a -year contract with 1. FC Kaiserslautern. He was suspended for unprofessional behaviour on 30 January 2009. He had trials with Championship side Ipswich Town, and will also spend time with Birmingham City. In January 2012, he transferred to Zagłębie Lubin.

After two years in Poland he signed for SK Slavia Prague in July 2014. Despite having played as a defensive midfielder for most of his career, he moved into the centre back position in Slavia. Bílek was handed the captain’s armband when he arrived in Prague after a season of relegation struggle for Slavia, they stayed in the first division only by a point.

In his first season in Slavia he helped the team to secure 11th place in the league scoring three goals. After Slavia’s takeover in september 2015 he remained club captain and started the new era under the Chinese ownership with a 5th place finish in the league. 
In 2016/17 his playing time started to decline as Slavia started to bring in new players, but Bílek still managed to play 17 games and as the captain he lifted the Czech league trophy after what was an incredible season for Slavia, who weren’t favorites to win the league before the start of the season. Bílek was still part of the squad for next season, but he only started in cup games and decided to hang up his boots after the first half of 2017/18 season.

Managerial career
He stayed in Slavia Prague after the end of his player career as an assistant to sports director Jan Nezmar. He learnt alongside the experienced manager and replaced him when he left the club in the summer of 2020. 
As sports director of Slavia Bílek managed to bring in players such as Abdallah Sima, Alexander Bah, Michael Krmenčík and many more to the red and white shirt. He also negotiated profitable sales of David Zima and Abdallah Sima in the summer of 2021.

References

External links
 
 
 

Living people
1983 births
Association football defenders
Czech footballers
Czech Republic youth international footballers
Czech Republic under-21 international footballers
FK Chmel Blšany players
FC Slovan Liberec players
1. FC Kaiserslautern players
SK Slavia Prague players
Czech First League players
Bundesliga players
2. Bundesliga players
Czech expatriate footballers
Czech expatriate sportspeople in Germany
Expatriate footballers in Germany
Czech expatriate sportspeople in Poland
Expatriate footballers in Poland
Footballers from Prague